Welcome to the Zoo is the debut studio album by American rapper Gorilla Zoe. It was released on September 25, 2007, by Bad Boy South, which was distributed by Block Entertainment. The album debuted at number 18 on the Billboard 200, selling 35,000 copies in its first week in the United States. The album was supported by two singles: "Hood Figga" and "Juice Box" featuring Yung Joc.

Critical reception 

Welcome to the Zoo received mixed reviews from critics. Steve 'Flash' Juon of RapReviews praised Gorilla for his voice and humorous lyrics but felt he was being dragged by the typical hip-hop clichés, concluding that "Welcome to the Zoo proves that Zoe has star potential - it's just that he may have been shoved into the spotlight prematurely." AllMusic's Jason Birchmeier said that the album was well-produced but criticized Zoe for being too similar to Young Jeezy, saying that "Jeezy can be witty and adorns his raps with a signature array of ad libs." Robert Christgau cited "Money Man", "Take Your Shoes Off" and "Do Something" as "choice cuts", indicating good songs on "an album that isn't worth your time or money."

Track listing

Chart positions

References

2007 debut albums
Gorilla Zoe albums
Bad Boy Records albums
Albums produced by Drumma Boy
Albums produced by Fatboi
Albums produced by Sha Money XL